Wonder Age is the debut album by alternative rock band Air Dubai, released on October 5, 2010 with production by Andrew Guerrero.

Background
On September 29, 2010 Air Dubai gave an interview with  Westword Magazine  announcing that their initial idea to release an EP had been scrapped and they planned to release a full-length album instead. This news came as a hard decision to the band as they had been performing as a full 7-member group for a full year and had yet to release any material.

After spending a month writing, recording for Wonder Age began in July 2010 where within a full week they finished tracking and mixing the 11 song album in Fort Collins, Colorado at The Blasting Room.

Singles
The band released "Restless Youth" as the album's lead single in conjunction with Channel 93.3's Hometown For The Holiday's Competition in December 2010. The single was voted as the top song for the year and won the band first place in the station's competition.

The second single "Ten Weeks", in addition to "Restless Youth" and album track "Lasers" were also very well received and landed the band syndication on episodes of MTV programs Jersey Shore, I Used To Be Fat and Friendzone as well as placement in ESPN's 2012 College Football season broadcast

Track listing

External links
Official site
Facebook page

2010 debut albums
Air Dubai albums